

This is a list of the women's doubles tennis champions at the Grand Slam tournaments, the WTA championships, the Olympic Games, and the WTA Tier I/Premier (Premier Mandatory and Premier 5)/1000 tournaments since 1990.

Champions list

Titles leaders 
 The leaders in these tournaments since 1990 are (10+ total titles):
 Important note: by setting 1990 as the cut-off point, this list excludes many notable champions in high level tournaments from the previous years. Totals including titles won before 1990 are in brackets.

Active players and records since 1990 are denoted in bold.

See also 
 List of WTA Tour top-level tournament singles champions
 List of Grand Slam women's doubles champions
 WTA Tier I tournaments
 List of Olympic medalists in tennis
 List of ATP Tour top-level tournament singles champions
 List of ATP Tour top-level tournament doubles champions

Notes

References 

WTA Tour
top-level
WTA Tour